is a ridge and park in Higashimurayama, Tokyo along its border with  Tokorozawa, Saitama. Its name translates literally into English as "Eight Country Mountain" since in times past, one could view the eight surrounding provinces surrounding Musashi Province from its top. In Japanese it is known as a ryokuchi (緑地) instead of a park. Ryokuchi literally means "green land" and denotes land used more as a natural setting instead of a typical park.

The park lies upon a low rising ridge rising about 15 to 20 meters above the surrounding plain. The highest elevation is about 100 meters above sea level. Measured from north to south, the park is from 100 to 300 meters, the park having an uneven size. From east to west the park is about 1.5 kilometers.  The trail that runs the length of the ridge top is about 2.0 kilometers and branches into many secondary trails. The total size of the park of is about 39 hectares or about 96 acres.

Historical significance

The park contains an archaeological site, the  dating from the Jōmon period with the remnants of irrigation and waterworks from the Jōmon through Muromachi periods. Numerous Sue ware pottery fragments have been found in the area.

The route of the ancient Tōsandō highway passed through what is now this park. In the year 1333,  Nitta Yoshisada established a campaign headquarters and raised his army's banner on a mound in what is now part of the park during the  Kōzuke-Musashi Campaign against the Kamakura shogunate. This location is commemorated by a stone marker at the park's north eastern end.

Admission to the park is free of charge.

Hachikokuyama in popular culture
It is famous for being an inspiration for parts of the anime film My Neighbor Totoro.

External links
 More information about the park (Japanese)

Higashimurayama, Tokyo
Parks and gardens in Tokyo